Scene in a Ruined Chapel is a 19th-century painting by Fleury François Richard, now in the Musée des Beaux-Arts de Lyon.

References

19th-century paintings
Paintings by Fleury François Richard
Paintings in the collection of the Museum of Fine Arts of Lyon
Churches in art